Singapore–Taiwan relations are the international relations between Singapore and Taiwan. Taiwan has a representative office in Singapore. Singapore operates the Singapore Trade Office in Taipei in Taiwan, both of whom are members of the World Trade Organization (WTO). The Presidential Envoy of ROC and Prime Minister of Singapore regularly meet, in the form similar to private state-to-state gesture diplomacy  at APEC.

Early history

As Singapore and Taiwan, both territories were under different spheres of influence.

As a colonial state under British Malaya rule, most early Chinese migrants came as labourers into Singapore escaping poverty and war. Many ethnic Chinese Singaporeans derived their ancestral roots in southern China from Fujian, Guangdong and Hainan provinces. During British rule in Singapore, Singapore and the Republic of China (1912–49) i.e. the larger China, had diplomatic relations.

As an island, Taiwan on the contrary, was known before World War I as the Republic of Formosa, with Taiwan under Japanese rule occurring between 1895 and 1945. It is geographically separate from Mainland China where the Kuomintang (KMT) party first began. During World War II, the KMT party that came to found the Republic of China was also part of the formation of the Reorganized National Government of the Republic of China in Mainland China, within the Japanese Greater East Asia Co-Prosperity Sphere. 

With the surrender of Japan after the war and following the Chinese Civil War, China broke into 2 separate entities, specifically the People's Republic of China and Taiwan (or the Republic of China), where surviving KMT forces retreated after losing the war against the Chinese communists; Singapore returned to British rule.

1965 - 2010
When Singapore became independent in 1965 from Malaysia, it briefly continued in recognising the Republic of China as the legitimate government of China. Culturally, the Republic of China and Nanyang Singapore have similarly large populations of ethnic Chinese who have ancestral origins from Fujian, Guangdong and Hainan provinces.

In the 1970s, the People's Republic of China and Singapore began unofficial relations.

Since the independence of Singapore and the establishment of Kuomintang rule over the island of Taiwan, the Singapore Armed Forces (SAF) adopted military training bases in Taiwan from 1975 that included combined arms exercises involving infantry, artillery, and armoured units. The then Prime Minister of Singapore Lee Kuan Yew also appointed Taiwanese
military personnel in training Republic of Singapore Air Force.

On 3 October 1990, Singapore revised diplomatic relations from the Republic of China to the People's Republic of China. The relationship between Singapore and the PRC has since improved significantly.

In 2004, shortly before the current Prime Minister of Singapore Lee Hsien Loong took office from the then incumbent Goh Chok Tong, he made a visit to Taiwan to familiarise himself with the latest developments there. In his maiden National Day Rally speech, Lee criticised the Taiwanese leadership and populace of overestimating the support they would receive if they were to declare Taiwan independence; Conversely in September, Singapore Foreign Minister George Yeo cautioned the United Nations General Assembly about the dangers of letting the cross-strait relationship deteriorate.

In 2009, the Singapore Trade Office in Taipei was honoured for its role in developing close economic ties between the two sides. Taiwan is Singapore's ninth largest trading partner, with bilateral trade topping S$35 billion in 2008.

2010 onwards

In bilateral trade, from 2010 till 2012, former Taiwanese vice-president Lien Chan announced talks between Taiwan and Singapore on a proposed economic partnership agreement. Finalised 7 November 2013, Taiwan and Singapore signed an economic partnership agreement called the Agreement between Singapore and the Separate Customs Territory of Taiwan, Penghu, Kinmen and Matsu on Economic Partnership (ASTEP) in Singapore in significantly reducing tariffs imposed by Taiwan on goods imported from Singapore. This is Taiwan's first economic partnership agreement signed with a member of ASEAN.

The Taipei Ministry of Foreign Affairs reassigned Vice Foreign Minister Vanessa Shih back after she reportedly angered Lee Kuan Yew and other high-ranking officials with a series of actions including singing the Republic of China (ROC) national anthem and raising the national flag at a public reception celebrating the ROC centennial, as well as making contact with Chen Show Mao, a member of the opposition Workers’ Party.
On 24 March 2015 Taiwan President Ma Ying-jeou made a low-profile day-trip visit to Singapore to pay tribute to late former Prime Minister of Singapore Lee Kuan Yew. Ma's visit came after an invitation from Singapore Prime Minister Lee Hsien Loong for the private family wake at the official residence of the Prime Minister in Ma's capacity as Lee Kuan Yew's "old friend".

Taiwanese leader Ma Ying-jeou and Chinese leader Xi Jinping met on 7 November 2015 in Singapore.

Military relations

In 1975, Premier Chiang Ching-kuo and Lee Kuan Yew signed an agreement codenamed “Project Starlight” (星光計畫, also known as Hsing Kuang), wherein Singaporean troops would be sent to Taiwan for training and joint exercises. These exercises, engaging as many as 10,000 troops at any one time, provided officers a chance to simulate wartime conditions more closely and gain experience in the command and control of operations involving several battalions.

See also
 Foreign relations of Taiwan
 Foreign relations of Singapore
 Bamboo network

References

 
Taiwan
Taiwan
Bilateral relations of Taiwan